Na Di is a tambon (sub-district) of Mueang Samut Sakhon District, Samut Sakhon Province, central Thailand.

History
Na Di in the past was called "Bang Ping" (บางปิ้ง), but changed the name after the year 1942 when there was a great flood. The word "Na Di" literally translated as "good rice field".

Geography
Na Di is bounded by other sub-districts (from north clockwise): Khlong Maduea in Krathum Baen District, Khok Krabue in its district, Tha Sai in its district, Ban Ko in its district.

Na Di has an area of approximately 23.817 km2 (9.196 mi2). The terrain is lowland with the canals running through the area. It is about 5 km (3 mi) from the Mueang Samut Sakhon District Office via Setthakit 1 road.

Administration
Na Di is under the governing of Samut Sakhon City.

Na Di also consists of nine administrative villages (muban)

Population
It has a total population of 28,095 people (13,282 men, 14,813 women in 16,548 households) in the year 2020.

Transportation
Because it is part of Bangkok Metropolitan Region, making Na Di easily accessible by three highways viz Rama II, Ekkachai, and Setthakit 1 roads.

The area is served by several bus lines of the Bangkok Mass Transit Authority (BMTA) and affiliated bus companies such as 7 (Samut Sakhon–Hua Lamphong), 68 (Samut Sakhon–Bang Lamphu), 105 (Maha Chai Mueang Mai–Khlong San), as well as many local buses.

Places
CentralPlaza Mahachai
Porto Chino
Wat Bang Ping
Wat Thep Norarat

Local products
Leather goods and leather bags
Benjarong (a kind of Thai porcelain with designs in five colours)
Dim sum

References

Tambon of Samut Sakhon Province